ANGEL Learning, Inc. was a privately held educational software company specializing in eLearning. Its main products are the ANGEL Learning Management Suite (LMS), ANGEL ePortfolio, and services offerings. In May 2009, it was acquired by Blackboard Inc.

Background
ANGEL Learning and the ANGEL LMS evolved from research at Indiana University-Purdue University Indianapolis (IUPUI). The initial research system deployed in 1996 became Indiana University's OnCourse founded by Ali Jafari and David Mills. The ANGEL LMS was created using the early system concepts and was released by the newly formed CyberLearning Labs, Inc. in July 2000. The company has since changed its name to ANGEL Learning. On May 6, 2009, competitor Blackboard Inc announced that it is purchasing ANGEL Learning with the merger's completion planned for the end of May, 2009.

Products

ANGEL Learning Management Suite
The ANGEL LMS is used by K-12 schools and districts, community colleges, universities and proprietary schools to create Virtual Learning Environments for online learning and to offer hybrid or blended (web-enhanced) classes. Corporations also use the system for online corporate training. The latest version, 7.4, was released in April 2009. It is for all students of the United States

ANGEL ePortfolio
ANGEL ePortfolio is used by students to create an electronic portfolio of their digital work. Schools use ANGEL ePortfolio to collect and report on data for accreditation purposes. The latest version, 2.1, was released in June 2008.

Services
ANGEL Learning also offers services such as training, implementation, integration, and application hosting.

R&D projects

Open Source Contributions
ANGEL Learning recently contributed source code to the development of the IMS/GLS Common Cartridge Digital Content and to educational wiki development through a source code contribution to TiddlyWiki.

Second Life
ANGEL Learning created and maintains ANGEL Learning Isle in Second Life. The island is open to educators for educational experimentation in the use of virtual collaboration technologies for online learning. The San Jose School of Library and Information Science is now working with ANGEL Learning on a project to integrate Second Life with the ANGEL LMS.

Partnerships
ANGEL Learning has a number of partners who either offer content in the ANGEL format or integrations to the ANGEL LMS. Some of these partners include BigGyan, Elluminate, Emantras, Pearson Education, SMARTHINKING, Tegrity,  Turnitin, Wiley, and Wimba.

Awards
The ANGEL LMS has received several industry awards, and ANGEL Learning has also been recognized by various organizations. Recent awards include:

2009 CODiE Finalist - Best Classroom Management Solution for preK-12
2009 CODiE Finalist - Best Postsecondary Course or Learning Management Solution
2008 CODiE Finalist - Best Postsecondary Course or Learning Management Solution
2007 IMS GLC First Place Learn-Sat Award
2007 CODiE Award - Best Postsecondary Course Content Management Solution
2006 CODiE Award - Best Postsecondary Course Content Management Solution
Parature Legend Makers Award

See also
E-Learning
Learning management system

References

Educational software companies